In geometry, the heptagonal prism is a prism with heptagonal base. This polyhedron has 9 faces, 21 edges, and 14 vertices.

Area 

Volume 

This formula also works for the oblique prism due to the  Cavalieri's principle.

Images 
The heptagonal prism can also be seen as a tiling on a sphere:

Related polyhedra

References

External links 

Prismatoid polyhedra